Shapes of Screams is the third and final studio album by the British rock band LostAlone released on 7 April 2014 on Graphite Records.

Release and promotion
Shapes of Screams was first previewed to fans at the Victoria Inn, Derby on 7 July 2013. LostAlone released the album's first single and music video, "The Bells! The Bells!" on 11 November 2013 as a free download. The album's title and release date was officially announced on 13 February 2014, alongside a headline UK tour in April.

LostAlone officially announced their third studio album, Shapes of Screams on 13 February 2014. Released on 7 April 2014 on Graphite Records to critical acclaim including a 5K (5/5) review in Kerrang! magazine and are currently touring the record.

"Shapes Of Screams is an album filled with first-kiss adrenaline, heart bursting happiness, life-affirming air-guitar moments and demented genius that will leave you delighted for hearing it" 5/5 Kerrang!

"That LostAlone aren’t Bon Jovi-massive yet is a source of consternation.” NME

"A fearless and absorbing work, it’s likely to be the finest rock album you’ll hear this year.” The Digital Fix

“Shapes Of Screams proves a continuation of their non-existent sonic boundaries.” Indulge Sound

"LostAlone continue their quest to resurrect epic, almost ridiculousl, grand rock on album three.” Total Guitar

"If I could only make one bold proclamation about music this year, it is this: LostAlone are the most underrated band in the world. Of all time"  Alternative Press

Track listing

Personnel
LostAlone
 Steven Battelle — Lead Vocals / Guitar 
 Alan Williamson  — Bass / Backing Vocals 
 Mark Gibson — Drums  / Backing Vocals

Production personnel
Produced by Dan Weller

Mixed by Adam Noble

Mastered by Dick Beetham

Artwork by Jim Cork

Gospel choir on Requiem - Urban Voice Collective.

References

LostAlone albums
2014 albums
Albums produced by Dan Weller